Puzzle & Action: Treasure Hunt, known in Japan as , and as , is a puzzle video game released for the Sega Titan Video in 1995, and ported to the Japanese Sega Saturn by CSK Research Institute Corp. in 1996. The Saturn version was re-released for the Satakore range in 1998. Puzzle & Action: Treasure Hunt is the third and final instalment in the Puzzle & Action series, after Puzzle & Action: Tant-R and Puzzle & Action: Ichidant-R. Like the previous games, players play a series of timed mini games to overcome enemies. Two players are supported.

Gameplay 

Gameplay is similar to the previous games, although the games are in 3D. There are four rounds of a number of timed mini games, and two players are supported. Twenty-two categorised mini games are featured, and like the previous instalments, there is a 'Free Play' mode where they can be practised. The Saturn version features a RPG-style 'Original mode', which features a shop where items such as torches and brooms can be purchased.

Reception 

The three reviewers at the Japanese Sega Saturn Magazine gave the game a good score.

References 

1995 video games
Arcade video games
CRI Middleware games
Minigame compilations
Multiplayer and single-player video games
Sega arcade games
Sega Saturn games
Video games developed in Japan